Streptomyces viridodiastaticus is a bacterium species from the genus of Streptomyces which has been isolated from soil.

See also 
 List of Streptomyces species

References

Further reading

External links
Type strain of Streptomyces viridodiastaticus at BacDive – the Bacterial Diversity Metadatabase

viridodiastaticus
Bacteria described in 1958